The 2020 Tulane Green Wave football team represented Tulane University in the 2020 NCAA Division I FBS football season. The Green Wave played their home games at Yulman Stadium in New Orleans, Louisiana, and competed in the American Athletic Conference. They were led by fifth-year head coach Willie Fritz.

On December 10, Fritz announced the firing of defensive coordinator Jack Curtis. The Green Wave went on to complete their regular season with a 6–5 record (3–5 in conference). They subsequently lost to Nevada in the Famous Idaho Potato Bowl.

Previous season
The Green Wave finished the 2019 campaign with an overall record of 7–6; they were 3–5 in AAC play to finish in fourth place in the West Division. They received an invitation to the Armed Forces Bowl, their first such appearance in the Fort Worth, Texas, annual game, where they defeated Southern Miss 30–13.

Preseason

Recruiting class

|}

Award watch lists
Listed in the order that they were released

AAC preseason media poll
The preseason Poll was released September 1

Schedule
Tulane had games scheduled against Mississippi State, Northwestern and Southeastern Louisiana,  which was canceled due to the COVID-19 pandemic.

Schedule Source:

Roster

Game summaries

at South Alabama

Navy

at Southern Miss

at Houston

SMU

at UCF

Temple

at East Carolina

Army

at Tulsa

Memphis

vs. Nevada (Famous Idaho Potato Bowl)

Rankings

Players drafted into the NFL

References

Tulane
Tulane Green Wave football seasons
Tulane Green Wave football